The India women's under-19 cricket team represents India in international under-19 women's cricket. The team is administrated by the Board of Control for Cricket in India (BCCI).

The team played their first official matches against New Zealand in late 2022, in preparation for the 2023 ICC Under-19 Women's T20 World Cup, the first ever international women's under-19 cricket competition. India's squad for the tournament was announced on 5 December 2022. The side went on to win the tournament, beating England in the final.

History
The inaugural Women's Under-19 World Cup was scheduled to take place in January 2021, but was postponed multiple times due to the COVID-19 pandemic. The tournament was eventually scheduled to take place in 2023, in South Africa. As a Full Member of the ICC, India qualified automatically for the tournament.

In November and December 2022, in preparation for the World Cup, India played a five-match T20I series against New Zealand, winning the series 5–0. During the series, India announced their 15-player squad for the World Cup, on 5 December 2022. They also played a six-match T20I series against South Africa in the lead-up to the tournament.

At the World Cup, the side topped both their group in the initial group stage and their Super Six group, qualifying for the semi-finals. They beat New Zealand in the semi-finals before beating England in the final by 7 wickets to claim the inaugural Women's Under-19 T20 World Cup title. India batter Shweta Sehrawat was the tournament's leading run-scorer, with 297 runs.

Recent call-ups
The table below lists all the players who have been selected in recent squads for India under-19s. This includes their squads for their series against New Zealand and South Africa, and for the 2023 ICC Under-19 Women's T20 World Cup.

ICC Women's Under-19 Cricket World Cup Record

Honours
 U-19 T20 World Cup:
 Champions (1): 2023

Records & statistics

International match summary

Record versus other nations

Leading run scorers

Leading wicket takers

Highest individual innings

Best individual bowling figures

Highest team totals

Lowest team totals

See also
India men's national cricket team
India women's national cricket team
India national under-19 cricket team

References

Women's Under-19 cricket teams
C
India in international cricket